The 2022–23 season is the 115th season in the history of R.S.C. Anderlecht and their 87th consecutive season in the top flight. The club are participating in the Belgian Pro League, the Belgian Cup, and the UEFA Europa Conference League.

Players

First-team squad

Other players under contract

Out on loan

Transfers

In

Out

Pre-season and friendlies

Competitions

Overall record

Pro League

League table

Results summary

Results by round

Matches 
The league fixtures were announced on 22 June 2022.

Belgian Cup

UEFA Europa Conference League

Third qualifying round 
The draw for the third qualifying round was held on 18 July 2022.

Play-off round 
The draw for the play-off round was held on 2 August 2022.

Group stage 

The draw for the group stage was held on 26 August 2022.

Knockout phase

Knockout round play-offs 
The knockout round play-offs draw was held on 7 November 2022.

Round of 16 
The knockout round play-offs draw was held on 24 February 2023.

References 

R.S.C. Anderlecht seasons
Anderlecht